His Epic Hits: The First 11 (To Be Continued...) is a compilation album by American country music artist Merle Haggard. It was released in 1983 via Epic Records.

Track listing

Chart performance

References

1984 compilation albums
Merle Haggard compilation albums
Albums produced by Ray Baker (music producer)
Albums produced by Chips Moman
Albums produced by Billy Sherrill
Epic Records compilation albums